Northeastern Oklahoma A&M College (NEO) is a public community college in Miami, Oklahoma. Established as the Miami School of Mines in 1919, NEO has an enrollment of approximately two thousand students.  The Golden Norsemen is the school mascot.

History

The Oklahoma Senate passed Senate Bill 225 on March 17, 1919 to establish the Miami School of Mines. The school began operations in September 1920. In 1924, the school became Northeastern Oklahoma Junior College, as mining became less important in Miami. In April 1943, the Board of Regents for the Agricultural and Mechanical Colleges gained control of the college, and the college became Northeastern Oklahoma A&M College.

Academics
Northeastern Oklahoma A&M offers certificate programs and associate degrees. The college offers certificates in: accounting, administrative assistant, child development, computer information systems, drafting and design, equine and ranch management, general office operations, management and marketing, and medical office assistant. The college offers Associate of Arts degrees in: Art and design, criminal justice, early childhood education, English, general studies, mass communications, music, Native American studies, Natural resources and ecology, Management, psychology and sociology, social sciences, and speech and theatre. Associate of Applied Science degrees include: business administrative technology, computer information science, construction management, equine and ranch management, medical lab technician, nursing, physical therapist assistant, and process technology. Associate of Science degrees are offered in: agriculture, business administration, accounting, elementary education, pre-engineering, natural science, nursing, physical education, sports management, and veterinary medicine.

Athletics
Northeastern Oklahoma A&M self-identifies in athletics as "NEO", and its mascot is Golden Norsemen for men's sports and Lady Norse for women's sports. Men's sports at NEO are baseball, football, basketball, soccer, and wrestling. Women's sports are basketball, softball, soccer, and volleyball. NEO also fields agricultural sports: horseback riding, horse judging, livestock judging, and rodeo.

Notable alumni
 Remi Ayodele – NFL player
 Matt Blair – NFL player
 Romby Bryant – NFL & CFL player
 Mike Butcher – MLB player & Coach, attended NEO in 1983-1984
 Marion Butts – NFL player
 Bo Bowling, Montreal Alouettes player
 Scott Case – NFL player
 Charlie Clemons – NFL player
Jason Dickson – Major League Baseball pitcher, attended NEO c.1993
 Ernest Givins – NFL player
Chuck Hoskin – Member of the Oklahoma House of Representatives
 Tony Hutson – NFL player
Deji Karim – NFL running back, attended NEO 2005-2006.
Brandon Keith – NFL offensive tackle, graduated in 2005.
 Ramón Laureano - Professional baseball outfielder for the Oakland Athletics Major League Baseball team.
 Ken Lunday – NFL player
 Juqua Parker – NFL player
 Tony Peters – NFL player
Jeremy Shockey – National Football League tight end, attended NEO in 1999. 
 Tyler Silva – North Dakota State Bison baseball
 Chuck Smith – NFL player
 Lamar Smith – NFL player
 Jace Sternberger - college football tight end
 Greg Tremble – NFL player
 James Wilder Sr. – NFL player
Pat Williams – NFL player, graduated from NEO in 1995.

References

External links
 

 
Educational institutions established in 1919
Education in Ottawa County, Oklahoma
Buildings and structures in Ottawa County, Oklahoma
1919 establishments in Oklahoma
Community colleges in Oklahoma
NJCAA athletics
Miami, Oklahoma